The Swiss Army knife is a multi-tool pocketknife manufactured by Victorinox. The term "Swiss Army knife" was coined by American soldiers after World War II after they had trouble pronouncing the German word "", meaning "officer’s knife".

The Swiss Army knife generally has a drop-point main blade plus other blades and tools such as screwdrivers, a can opener, a saw blade, a pair of scissors, and many others. These are stowed inside the handle of the knife through a pivot point mechanism. The handle is traditionally a red color, with either a Victorinox or Wenger "cross" logo or, for Swiss military issue knives, the coat of arms of Switzerland. Other colors, textures, and shapes have appeared over the years.

Originating in Ibach, Switzerland, the Swiss Army knife was first produced in 1891 when the Karl Elsener company, which later became Victorinox, won the contract to produce the Swiss Army's Modell 1890 knife from the previous German manufacturer. In 1893, the Swiss cutlery company Paul Boéchat & Cie, which later became Wenger SA, received its first contract from the Swiss military to produce model 1890 knives; the two companies split the contract for provision of the knives from 1908 until Victorinox acquired Wenger in 2005. A cultural icon of Switzerland, both the design of the knife and its versatility have worldwide recognition. The term "Swiss Army knife" has acquired usage as a figure of speech indicating extreme utility applicable to more or less any scenario at hand.

History

Origins 
The Swiss Army Knife was not the first multi-use pocket knife. In 1851, in Moby-Dick (chapter 107), Herman Melville mentions the "Sheffield contrivances, assuming the exterior – though a little swelled – of a common pocket knife; but containing, not only blades of various sizes, but also screw-drivers, cork-screws, tweezers, awls, pens, rulers, nail-filers and countersinkers."

During the late 1880s, the Swiss Army decided to purchase a new folding pocket knife for their soldiers. This knife was to be suitable for use by the army in opening canned food and for maintenance of the Swiss service rifle, the Schmidt–Rubin, which required a screwdriver for assembly and disassembly.

In January 1891, the knife received the official designation Modell 1890. The knife had a blade, reamer, can opener, screwdriver, and grips made out of dark oak wood that some say was later partly replaced with ebony wood. At that time no Swiss company had the necessary production capacity, so the initial order for 15,000 knives was placed with the German knife manufacturer Wester & Co. from Solingen, Germany. These knives were delivered in October 1891.

In 1891, Karl Elsener, then owner of a company that made surgical equipment, set out to manufacture the knives in Switzerland itself. At the end of 1891 Elsener began production of the Modell 1890 knives, in direct competition with the Solingen company. He incurred financial losses doing so, as Wester & Co was able to produce the knives at a lower cost. Elsener was on the verge of bankruptcy when, in 1896, he developed an improved knife, intended for the use by officers, with tools attached on both sides of the handle using a special spring mechanism, allowing him to use the same spring to hold them in place. This new knife was patented on 12 June 1897,  with a second, smaller cutting blade, a corkscrew, and wood fibre grips, under the name of Schweizer Offiziers- und Sportmesser ("Swiss officer's and sports knife"). While the Swiss military did not commission the knife, it was successfully marketed internationally, restoring Elsener's company to prosperity.

Elsener used a variation on the Swiss coat of arms to identify his knives beginning in 1909. With slight modifications, this is still the company logo. Also in 1909, on the death of his mother, Elsener used his mother's name Victoria, as a brand name, in her honour. In 1921 following the invention of stainless steel ( in French), Karl Elsener's son renamed the company to be Victorinox combining Victoria and inoxydable.

In 1893 the second industrial cutler of Switzerland, Paul Boéchat & Cie, headquartered in Delémont in the French-speaking region of Jura, started selling a similar product. Its general manager, Théodore Wenger, acquired the company and renamed it the Wenger Company.

Victorinox and Wenger 

In 1908 the Swiss government split the contract between Victorinox and Wenger, placing half the orders with each.
By mutual agreement, Wenger advertised "the Genuine Swiss Army Knife" and Victorinox used the slogan, "the Original Swiss Army Knife".

On 26 April 2005, Victorinox acquired Wenger, once again becoming the sole supplier of knives to the military of Switzerland. Victorinox at first kept the Wenger brand intact, but on  30 January 2013, the company announced that the Wenger brand of knives would be abandoned in favour of Victorinox.
The press release stated that Wenger's factory in Delémont would continue to produce knives and all employees at this site will retain their jobs. They further elaborated that an assortment of items from the Wenger line-up will remain in production under the Victorinox brand name. Wenger's US headquarters will be merged with Victorinox's location in Monroe, Connecticut. Wenger's watch and licensing business will continue as a separate brand: SwissGear.

Up until 2008 Victorinox AG and Wenger SA supplied about 50,000 knives to the military of Switzerland each year, and manufactured many more for export, mostly to the United States. Commercial knives can be distinguished by their cross logos; the Victorinox cross logo is surrounded by a shield while the Wenger cross logo is surrounded by a slightly rounded square.

Victorinox registered the words "Swiss Army" and "Swiss Military" as a trademark in the US and was sued at Bern cantonal commercial court by the Swiss Confederacy (represented by Armasuisse, the authority representing the actual Swiss military), in October 2018. After an initial hearing Victorinox agreed to cede the registration in the United States of the term "Swiss military" to Armasuisse in return for an exclusive licence to market perfumes under the same name.

Features, tools, and parts

Tools and components 

There are various models of the Swiss Army knife with different tool combinations. 

Though Victorinox does not provide custom knives, they have produced many different variations to suit individual users, with the Wenger company producing even more model variations. 

Common Main Layer Tools:
 Large blade - With 'VICTORINOX SWISS MADE' tang stamp on Victorinox blades (since 2005) to verify the knife's authenticity
 Small blade
 Nail file / nail cleaner
 Scissors
 Wood saw
 Metal file / metal saw with Nail file / nail cleaner / 
 Magnifying lens
 Phillips screwdriver
 Fish scaler / hook disgorger / ruler in cm and inches
 Pliers / wire cutter / wire crimper
 Can opener / 3 mm slotted screwdriver
 Bottle opener / 6 mm slotted screwdriver / wire stripper

Other Main Layer Tools:
 LED light
 USB flash drive
 Hoof cleaner
 Shackle opener / marlinspike
 Electrician's blade / wire scraper
 Pruning blade
 Pharmaceutical spatula (cuticle pusher)
 Cyber Tool (bit driver)
 Combination tool containing cap opener / can opener / 5 mm slotted screwdriver / wire stripper

Back Layer Tools:
 Corkscrew or Phillips driver
 Reamer
 Multipurpose hook
 2mm slotted screwdriver
 Chisel
 Mini screwdriver (designed to fit within the corkscrew)
 Keyring

Scale Tools:
 Tweezers
 Toothpick
 Pressurized ballpoint pen (with a retractable version on smaller models, and can be used to set DIP switches)
 Stainless pin
 Digital clock / alarm / timer / altimeter / thermometer / barometer

Three Victorinox SAK models had a butane lighter: the Swissflame, Campflame, and Swisschamp XXLT, first introduced in 2002 and then discontinued in 2005. The models were never sold in the United States due to lack of safety features.

In January 2010, Victorinox announced the Presentation Master models, released in April 2010. The technological tools included a laser pointer, and detachable flash drive with fingerprint reader. Victorinox now sells an updated version called the Slim Jetsetter, with "a premium software package that provides ultra secure data encryption, automatic backup functionality, secure web surfing capabilities, file and email synchronization between the drive and multiple computers, Bluetooth pairing and much more. On the hardware side of things, biometric fingerprint technology, laser pointers, LED lights, Bluetooth remote control and of course, the original Swiss Army Knife implements – blade, scissors, nail file, screwdriver, key ring and ballpoint pen are standard. **Not every feature is available on every model within the collection."

In 2006, Wenger produced a knife called "The Giant" that included every implement the company ever made, with 87 tools and 141 different functions. It was recognized by Guinness World Records as the world's most multifunctional penknife. It retails for about €798 or $US1000, though some vendors charge much higher prices.

In the same year, Victorinox released the SwissChamp XAVT, consisting of 118 parts and 80 functions with a retail price of $425. The Guinness Book of Records recognizes a unique 314-blade Swiss Army-style knife made in 1991 by Master Cutler Hans Meister as the world's largest penknife, weighing .

Locking mechanisms 

Some Swiss Army knives have locking blades to prevent accidental closure. Wenger was the first to offer a "PackLock" for the main blade on several of their standard 85mm models. Several large  Wenger and Victorinox models have a locking blade secured by a slide lock that is operated with an unlocking-button integrated in the scales. Some Victorinox 111 mm series knives have a double liner lock that secures the cutting blade and large slotted screwdriver/cap opener/wire stripper combination tool designed towards prying.

Design and materials 
Rivets and flanged bushings made from brass hold all machined steel parts and other tools, separators and the scales together. The rivets are made by cutting and pointing appropriately sized bars of solid brass.

The separators between the tools have been made from aluminium alloy since 1951. This makes the knives lighter. Previously these separating layers were made of nickel-silver.

The martensitic stainless steel alloy used for the cutting blades is optimized for high toughness and corrosion resistance and has a composition of 15% chromium, 0.60% silicon, 0.52% carbon, 0.50% molybdenum, and 0.45% manganese and is designated X55CrMo14 or DIN 1.4110 according to Victorinox. After a hardening process at 1040 °C and annealing at 160 °C the blades achieve an average hardness of 56 HRC. This steel hardness is suitable for practical use and easy resharpening, but less than achieved in stainless steel alloys used for blades optimized for high wear resistance. According to Victorinox the martensitic stainless steel alloy used for the other parts is X39Cr13 (aka DIN 1.4031, AISI/ASTM 420) and for the springs X20Cr13 (aka DIN 1.4021, but still within AISI/ASTM 420).

The steel used for the wood saws, scissors and nail files has a steel hardness of HRC 53, the screwdrivers, tin openers and awls have a hardness of HRC 52, and the corkscrew and springs have a hardness of HRC 49.

The metal saws and files, in addition to the special case hardening, are also subjected to a hard chromium plating process so that iron and steel can also be filed and cut.

Although red Cellulose Acetate Butyrate (CAB) (generally known trade names are Cellidor, Tenite and Tenex) scaled Swiss Army knives are most common, there are many colors and alternative materials like more resilient nylon and aluminum for the scales available. Many textures, colors and shapes now appear in the Swiss Army Knife. Since 2006 the scales on some knife models can have textured rubber non-slip inlays incorporated, intended for sufficient grip with moist or wet hands. The rubber also provides some impact protection for such edged scales. Modifications have been made, including professionally produced custom models combining novel materials, colors, finishes  and occasionally new tools such as firesteels  or tool 'blades' mounting replaceable surgical scalpel blades to replacement of standard scales (handles) with new versions in natural materials such as buffalo horn. In addition to 'limited edition' productions runs, numerous examples from basic to professional-level customizations of standard knives—such as retrofitting pocket clips, one-off scales created using 3D printing techniques, decoration using anodization and new scale materials—can be found by searching for "SAK mods".

Assembly 
During assembly, all components are placed on several brass rivets. The first components are generally an aluminium separator and a flat steel spring. Once a layer of tools is installed, another separator and spring are placed for the next layer of tools. This process is repeated until all the desired tool layers and the finishing separator are installed. Once the knife is built, the metal parts are fastened by adding brass flanged bushings to the rivets. The excess length of the rivets is then cut off to make them flush with the bushings. Finally, the remaining length of the rivets is flattened into the flanged bushings.

After the assembly of the metal parts, the blades on smaller knives are sharpened to a 15° angle, resulting in a 30° V-shaped steel cutting edge. From  sized knives the blades are sharpened to a 20° angle, resulting in a 40° V-shaped steel cutting edge. Chisel ground blades are sharpened to a 24° angle, resulting in a 24° asymmetric-shaped steel cutting edge were only one side is ground and the other is deburred and remains flat. The blades are then checked with a laser reflecting goniometer to verify the angle of the cutting edges.

Finally, scales are applied. Slightly undersized holes incorporated into the inner surface enclose the bushings, which have truncated cone cross-section and are slightly undercut, forming a one-way interference fit when pressed into the generally softer and more elastic scale material. The result is a tight adhesive-free connection that nonetheless permits new identical-pattern scales to be quickly and easily applied.

Sizes 
The thickness of the knives varies depending on the number of tool layers included. The  models offer the most variety in tool configurations in the Victorinox model line with as many as 15 layers.

Thickness varies depending on the number of tool layers included. The  models offer the most variety in tool configurations in the Wenger model line, with as many as 10 layers.

Knives issued by the Swiss Armed Forces 

Since the first issue as personal equipment in 1891 the Soldatenmesser (Soldier Knives) issued by the Swiss Armed Forces have been revised several times. There are five different main Modelle (models). Their model numbers refer to the year of introduction in the military supply chain. Several main models have been revised over time and therefore exist in different Ausführungen (executions), also denoted by the year of introduction. The issued models of the Swiss Armed Forces are:
 Modell 1890
 Modell 1890 Ausführung 1901
 Modell 1908
 Modell 1951
 Modell 1951 Ausführung 1954
 Modell 1951 Ausführung 1957
 Modell 1961
 Modell 1961 Ausführung 1965
 Modell 1961 Ausführung 1978
 Modell 1961 Ausführung 1994
 Soldatenmesser 08 (Soldier Knife 08)

Soldier Knives are issued to every recruit or member of the Swiss Armed Forces and the knives issued to officers have never differed from those issued to non-commissioned officers and privates. A model incorporating a corkscrew and scissors was produced as an officer's tool, but was deemed not "essential for survival". Officers were free to purchase it individually on their own account.

Soldier knife model 1890 

The Soldier Knife model 1890 had a spear point blade, reamer, can-opener, screwdriver and grips made out of oak wood scales (handles) that were treated with rapeseed oil for greater toughness and water-repellency, which made them black in color. The wooden grips of the Modell 1890 tended to crack and chip so in 1901 these were changed to a hard reddish-brown fiber similar in appearance to wood.

Soldier knife model 1908 

The Soldier Knife model 1908 had a clip point blade rather than the 1890s spear point blade, still with the fiber scales, carbon steel tools, nickel-silver bolster, liners, and divider. The contract with the Swiss Army split production equally between the Victorinox and Wenger companies.

Soldier knife model 1951 

The soldier Knife model 1951 had fiber scales, nickel-silver bolsters, liners, and divider, and a spear point blade. This was the first Swiss Armed Forces issue model where the tools were made of stainless steel. The screwdriver now had a scraper arc on one edge.

Soldier knife model 1961 

The  1961 model also contains a brass spacer, which allows the knife, with the screwdriver and the reamer extended simultaneously, to be used to assemble the SIG 550 and SIG 510 assault rifles: the knife serves as a restraint to the firing pin during assembly of the lock. The Soldier Knife model 1961 was manufactured only by Victorinox and Wenger and was the first issued knife bearing the Swiss Coat of Arms on the handle.

Soldier knife 08 

In 2007 the Swiss Government made a request for new updated soldier knives for the Swiss military for distribution in late 2008. The evaluation phase of the new soldier knife began in February 2008, when Armasuisse issued an invitation to tender. A total of seven suppliers from Switzerland and other countries were invited to participate in the evaluation process. Functional models submitted by suppliers underwent practical testing by military personnel in July 2008, while laboratory tests were used to assess compliance with technical requirements. A cost-benefit analysis was conducted and the model with the best price/performance ratio was awarded the contract. The order for 75,000 soldier knives plus cases was worth .

Victorinox won the contest with a knife based on the One-Hand German Army Knife as issued by the German Bundeswehr and released in the civilian model lineup with the addition of a toothpick and tweezers stored in the nylon grip scales (side cover plates) as the One-Hand Trekker/Trailmaster model. Mass production of the new Soldatenmesser 08 (Soldier Knife 08) for the Swiss Armed Forces was started in December 2008, and first issued to the Swiss Armed Forces beginning with the first basic training sessions of 2009.

The Soldier Knife 08 is manufactured only by Victorinox.

Knives issued by other militaries 
The armed forces of more than 20 different nations have issued or approved the use of various versions of Swiss army knives made by Victorinox, among them the forces of Germany, France, the Netherlands, Norway, Malaysia and the United States (NSN 1095-01-653-1166 Knife, Combat).

Space program 
The Swiss Army knife has been present in space missions carried out by NASA since the late 1970s. In 1978, NASA sent a letter of confirmation to Victorinox regarding a purchase of 50 knives known as the Master Craftsman model. In 1985, Edward M. Payton, brother of astronaut Gary E. Payton, sent a letter to Victorinox, asking about getting a Master Craftsman knife after seeing the one his brother used in space. There are other stories of repairs conducted in space using a Swiss Army knife.

Cultural impact 
The Swiss Army knife has been added to the collection of the Museum of Modern Art in New York and Munich's State Museum of Applied Art for its design. The term "Swiss Army" currently is a registered trademark owned by Victorinox AG and its subsidiary, Wenger SA.

In both the original television series MacGyver as well as its 2016 reboot, character Angus MacGyver frequently uses different Swiss Army knives in various episodes to solve problems and construct simple objects.

The term "Swiss Army knife" has entered popular culture as a metaphor for usefulness and adaptability. The multi-purpose nature of the tool has also inspired a number of other gadgets.

A particularly large Wenger knife model, Wenger 16999, has inspired a large number of humorous reviews on Amazon. This model was recognized by Guinness World Records as 'The World’s Most Multifunctional Penknife'.

When U.S. District Court for the Southern District of California Roger Benitez overturned California's 30-year-old ban on assault weapons in Miller v. Bonta, he compared the Swiss Army knife to the AR-15 rifle in the first sentence of his opinion, "Like the Swiss Army Knife, the popular AR-15 rifle is a perfect combination of home defense weapon and homeland defense equipment." In response, California Governor Gavin Newsom stated that the comparison "completely undermines the credibility of this decision".

See also 
 Gerber multitool
 Leatherman
 Pocketknife
 Swiss Army Man, a 2016 film that uses absurdist humor to manipulate a man's corpse like a multi-tool

References

Further reading 

 The Knife and its History – Written on the occasion of the centennial anniversary of Victorinox. Printed in Switzerland in 1984. Begins with 117 pages covering the history of world cutlery, beginning in the Stone Age; many black-and-white prints from old books. 72 pages on the history of the Victorinox company; color photos of the factory, production, and knives. There is an edition in German also, Das Messer and Seine Geschichte. A large-format hardback.
 Swiss Army Knife Handbook: The Official History and Owner's Guide, by Kathryn Kane.  Printed in US, 1988. Practical information on the tools, modifications, uses. 93 pages, paperback booklet. Published by the Swiss Army Knife Society.
 Die Lieferanten von Schweizer Soldatenmessern Seit 1891, by Martin Frosch, a binder-format in German with drawings dealing mainly with the technical details of the Soldier model up through 1988.
 A Collector's Guide to Victorinox 58 mm Pocket Knives. Published about 1990 by the author, Daniel J. Jacquart, President of the Victorinox SAK Society. 173 pages enumerating the models, scale materials, colors. Binder format with black & white photos.
 A Fervour Over Knives: Celebrating the centennial of Wenger. Printed in Switzerland in 1993. Eight pages on the history of cutlery, 28 pages on the Delémont region of the 19th century, its iron, forges, waters, businesses. 97 pages on the Wenger company; striking color photographs of production and knives. Large-format hardback.
 Swiss Army Knives: A Collectors Companion, by Derek Jackson. Published in London, printed in the United Arab Emirates, 1999; a 2nd edition printed in China, 2003. 35 pages on the history of cutlery; 157 pages on Victorinox knives, brief history of the company, almost no mention of Wenger; no history of models or development of tools. Much of it is material reproduced from Victorinox's The Knife and its History. A first boxed edition included a Soldier with Carl Elsener's signature engraved on the blade; the second edition was sometimes accompanied by one of a limited run (1 of 5,000) 2008 Soldier, last of the Model 1961.
 A friend in need, printed by Victorinox. The first edition no title and no date; a second edition dated 2003. 60 pages (2nd edition 56 pages) of true stories about lives saved, emergencies handled, situations resolved with the SAK.
 The Swiss Army Knife Owner's Manual, by Michael M. Young, 2011. Published by the author, printed in the US. 224 page paperback with 96 color photos and several drawings. Chapters on the history of the Victorinox and Wenger companies and the factories, the development of the Soldier and Officer models, charts of the main models made by both companies, care and safe use, improvised uses, results of physical tests, repairs and modifications, true stories.
 Les couteaux du soldat de l'Armée suisse, by Robert Moix, 2013. An informative summary in French, with many photos, of the many types and the various manufacturers of the pocketknife issued to the Swiss Army.

External links 

 Victorinox manufacturer's website
 SAKWiki

Products introduced in 1891
Camping equipment
Mechanical hand tools
Pocket knives
Swiss inventions
Victorinox